The Swell-Head is a 1927 American silent drama film directed by Ralph Graves and starring Graves, Johnnie Walker and Eugenia Gilbert.

Cast 
 Ralph Graves as Lefty Malone
 Johnnie Walker as Bill O'Rourke
 Eugenia Gilbert as Molly O'Rourke
 Mildred Harris as Kitty
 Mary Carr as Mother Malone
 Tom Dugan as Malone's Manager

References

External links 
 

1927 drama films
1927 films
American black-and-white films
Silent American drama films
American silent feature films
Columbia Pictures films
1920s English-language films
Films directed by Ralph Graves
Films with screenplays by Robert Lord (screenwriter)
1920s American films